Çağla is a Turkish given name for females originating from the word 'Çağlamak' which is a description of the way water flows in a waterfall (ie - full with life and energy).  Çağla means the action of that flowing water.  The name also means unripe almonds, which is a delicacy in Turkey. The male equivalent of the name is Çağlar.

People named Çağla include:
 Çağla Akgerman Darveaux (born 1970), Turkish American FinTech consultant
 Çağla Okyay (born 1995), Turkish chemical engineer
 Çağla Beano (born 1995), Turkish yoga instructor 
 Çağla Baktıroğlu (born 1988), Turkish-Canadian ice hockey player
 Çağla Baş (born 1992), Turkish wheelchair basketball player and Paralympic shooter
 Çağla Büyükakçay (born 1989), Turkish tennis player: She has won ten singles and 14 doubles titles on the ITF Circuit. 
 Çağla Demirsal (born 1995), Turkish ice dancer
 Çağla Korkmaz (born 1990), Turkish-German women's footballer
 Çağla Kubat (born 1979), Turkish model, actress and windsurfer
 Çağla Yaman (born 1981), Turkish handball player
 Nazlı Çağla Dönertaş (born 1991), Turkish yachtracer

Turkish feminine given names